Cedar Island State Park is a  state park located in the Town of Hammond in St. Lawrence County, New York. The park comprises half of Cedar Island, located in Chippewa Bay in the St. Lawrence River, part of the Thousand Islands region. The remainder of the island is privately owned.

The park was established in 1898 as part of the St. Lawrence Reservation.

Park description
Cedar Island State Park is accessible only by boat. The park offers dockage, fishing, seasonal waterfowl hunting, pavilions, picnic tables, and a campground with 18 tent sites.

See also
 List of New York state parks

References

External links
 New York State Parks: Cedar Island State Park

State parks of New York (state)
Parks in St. Lawrence County, New York